The International Center for Research on Women (ICRW) is a non-profit organization headquartered in Washington, D.C., United States, with regional offices in New Delhi, India, Nairobi, Kenya, and Kampala, Uganda. ICRW has project offices in Mumbai and Hyderabad, India. ICRW works to promote gender equitable development within the field of international development.

Mission
According to the organization Web site:

Focus areas
ICRW research identifies women's contributions to their communities and the barriers – like HIV, violence, and lack of education – that prevent them from being economically stable and able to fully participate in society. It focuses on three paths of action to achieve this:

 Designing concrete, evidence-based plans for program designers, donors and policymakers that empower women to control their lives and help shape the future of their communities
 Measuring changes in the lives of women and girls – as well as men and boys – to know how best to achieve gender equality
 Recommending policy priorities that give women opportunities to transform their lives

Some of its priorities include the economic empowerment of women, the prevention of HIV/AIDS among women and girls, the elimination of violence against women, the creation of better life options for women and girls, combating child marriage, and increasing food security for vulnerable women.

ICRW is primarily a research institution whose strong quantitative and qualitative research contributes to the direct action of organizations and communities in which they work.  

The ICRW website provides access to thousands of research reports, books, fact sheets, and policy briefs as well as toolkits and trainer's guides.

Leadership
ICRW is led by President Dr. Sarah Degnan Kambou, a social scientist who was appointed by the board in 2010. Previously, Degnan Kambou served for two years as ICRW's chief operating officer (COO) under former president Geeta Rao Gupta, and then as interim president and COO after Rao Gupta stepped down in April 2010.

Degnan Kambou joined ICRW in 2002. As COO, she led the organization's research and programs, finance and human resources departments as well as ICRW's Asia Regional Office in New Delhi, India. Before that, she was vice president of health and development, overseeing research in HIV and AIDS, reproductive health and nutrition as well as in gender, violence and women's rights.

In 2012 President Barack Obama appointed Degnan Kambou to his Global Development Council, which advises him and members of his Cabinet on how to improve U.S. foreign assistance. In 2010, Degnan Kambou was appointed by United States Secretary of State Hillary Clinton to represent ICRW on the U.S. National Commission for the United Nations Educational, Scientific and Cultural Organization (UNESCO).

Degnan Kambou holds a doctorate in international health policy and a master's in public health from Boston University. She earned her bachelor's degree in French from the University of Connecticut.

Degnan Kambou is ICRW's fourth president in its 40-year history. Ravi Verma is the director of ICRW's Asia Regional Office, and Stella Mukasa directs its Africa Regional Office.

Board of directors
ICRW has been directed by several renowned and well-recognized individuals within the field of international development as well as other key private sector and government individuals, including Nobel Laureate Amartya Sen, writer Ann Crittenden, and Brooke Shearer (deceased, May 19, 2009), spouse of Strobe Talbott, director of the Brookings Institution.

The board of directors as of 2020:

 Scott Jackson, (Chair)
 Patience Marime-Ball, (Vice Chair)
 Tara Abrahams
 Jackie Asiimwe
 Phyllis Costanza
 Carole Dickert-Scherr
 Søren Elbech
 Trevor Gandy
 Vimi Grewal-Carr
 Marijke Jurgens-Dupree
 Jennifer Klein
 Haven Ley
 Jacquelyn Mayfield
 Firoza Mehrotra
 Linda Perkins
 Shubhi Rao
 Lois Romano
 Milton D. Speid

Board officers 
 Sarah Degnan Kambou (President)
 Patricia Daunas (Chief Operations Officer, Board Treasurer)
 Kathryn Reitz (Research Compliance Director, Secretary to the Board)

Annual events and lectures
ICRW annually hosts the Irene Tinker Lecture, a fall lecture series named in honor of one of ICRW's founders and supporters, Dr. Irene Tinker. The lecture series has included speakers such as Mary Robinson, former President of Ireland, and Nobel Laureate in Economics Amartya Sen. The organization also honors esteemed individuals who have made contributions in the fields of gender and development with its annual Champions for Change awards.

References

External links
 Official ICRW website
 Charity Navigator information and ratings
 Sarah Degnan Kambou Appointed ICRW President

 
Development charities based in the United States
Gender studies organizations
Think tanks established in 1976
Women's rights organizations
Think tanks based in Washington, D.C.
International women's organizations
India-focused charities
1976 establishments in Washington, D.C.
Women in Washington, D.C.
Women in Delhi